Carleton is a crater on Mercury.  Its name was adopted by the International Astronomical Union (IAU) on October 19, 2018. Carleton is named for the Irish writer William Carleton.

The scarp known as Belgica Rupes cuts across Carleton and extends to the east.

References

Impact craters on Mercury